The Phoenix MLS stadium is a proposed 21,000 seat soccer-specific stadium to be built in Tempe, Arizona for the Phoenix Rising FC, in its effort to join the MLS. 

In May 2017, Phoenix Rising signed an agreement with Goldman Sachs to help funding of a new stadium on land purchased from the Salt River Pima-Maricopa Indian Community if selected.

References

Sports venues in Arizona
Major League Soccer stadiums
Proposed stadiums in the United States
Soccer venues in Arizona